Bengalee was a three-masted merchant barque built in 1837 at Dumbarton. She first appeared in Lloyd's Register (LR) in 1838 with Hamlin, master, Hamlin and Company, of Greenock, owners, and trade Clyde–Calcutta. Captain Thomas Hamlin did not allow the consumption of alcohol on his ship, thus it was known as a temperance ship.

Voyages 
Hamburg to Port Adelaide, South Australia. Bengalee left Hamburg on 16 July 1838 and stopped at the Downs. She arrived at Kingscote, South Australia on 9 November and at Port Adelaide on 16 November. Although primarily carrying supplies, she also carried 27 passengers, among whom were a group of the first Prussian settlers to Australia. From Port Adelaide she sailed on 29 February 1839 to Batavia.
Calcutta to Liverpool - arrived 16 December 1839
??? to Sydney - arrived 26 June 1840
Hobart Town to Canton - arrived 3 November 1843

Fate
Bengalee  was driven ashore on 23 October 1851 and broke her back at Saugor. Her crew abandoned her. She was on a voyage from Calcutta to Genoa, Kingdom of Sardinia.

Citations

References
 "Ships arriving in South Australia 1838", Pioneers Association of South Australia
 "Shipping Arrivals", South Australian Genealogy & Heraldry Society Inc
 "Bengalee", Private homepage of Graeme Moad
 "Bengalee 1838", Private webpages of DIANE CUMMINGS
 "Australian shipping 1788-1968", Convictions: Australian Shipping on the net

Barques
1837 ships
Age of Sail merchant ships of England
Maritime incidents in October 1851
Migrant ships to Australia